Marshall Bay is a bay , lying between Cape Vik and Cape Hansen on the south side of Coronation Island, in the South Orkney Islands, Antarctica. It was roughly charted in 1912–13 by Petter Sørlle, a Norwegian whaling captain. The bay was recharted in 1933 by Discovery Investigations personnel on the Discovery II, who gave the name for surgeon Dr. E.H. Marshall, a member of the Marine Executive Staff of the Discovery Committee.

References

Coronation Island
Bays of the South Orkney Islands